The  occurred in late June 1937 on the Amur River, at the Soviet–Manchukuo border.

Background
Kanchazu (also spelled "Kanchatzu" ) Island  is an unoccupied  island that is located in the center of the Amur River. The island acted as the official border between Manchuko and the Soviet Union.

Events
On June 19, two Soviet motorboats crossed the center line of the river, unloaded 20 troops, and occupied Kanchazu Island.

The next day, 17 Manchuko police and soldiers were sent to investigate the border intrusion. Soviet troops, numbering around 40 men, were now entrenched on Kanchazu Island and building fortifications. The Manchurian patrol was driven back by Soviet soldiers.

On 29 June, a planned operation by the Imperial Japanese Army's 1st Division headquarters was approved for a night attack on Kanchazu for the expulsion of Soviet troops from the island. The operation was ultimately delayed and rescheduled for the next day.

On the morning of June 30, Japanese soldiers from the 49th Regiment of the 1st Division led by Colonel Mihara Kanae launched a prolonged attack against the Soviets. The attack began with the use of two horse-drawn 37 mm artillery pieces. The Japanese soldiers proceeded to set up hastily-improvised firing sites, and they loaded their guns with both high-explosive and armor-piercing shells. The shelling sank the lead gunboat, killed seven crew members, and crippled the second, and driving off the third. During the confrontation, the Soviets responded with minimal return gunfire, which result in no Japanese casualties.

Soviet crewmen of the first sunken gunboat were left stranded and forced to swim to the northern side of the bank into Soviet territory. Many casualties were inflicted when Japanese troops opened fire on the swimming crewmen with a barrage of machine-gun fire. Around 37 Soviet troops were killed in the incident. The island was left abandoned and was later reclaimed by Japanese troops.

Aftermath
Shigemitsu Mamoru, the Japanese ambassador to the Soviet Union, met with Soviet Commissar of Foreign Affairs Maxim Litvinov on June 29 to discuss the turn of events. The Soviets insisted the Amur Islands belonged to them from an 1860 agreement and their placement on a Soviet map. During negotiations, the Soviets, however, agreed to pull back their forces from the Amur River to defuse the situation. Apparently, the Soviets were more concerned with events unfolding in Northern China and Europe as well as internal strife. In the aftermath, seven Soviet gunboats appeared sometime in July, but the Japanese took no action.

Eventually, as part of the agreement, the Soviets were allowed to salvage the sunken gunboat, which was accomplished between October 22 to 29 in the same year.

References

Sources
 

Battles involving Japan
Battles involving the Soviet Union
Conflicts in 1937
History of Manchuria
1937 in Japan
1937 in the Soviet Union
Japan–Soviet Union relations
Pacific theatre of World War II
Battles involving Manchukuo
June 1937 events
Soviet–Japanese border conflicts